Widyawati (born July 12, 1950) is an Indonesian actress. She is the widow of Indonesian actor, director and politician, Sophan Sophiaan. Her father in-law is  the former Indonesian ambassador for the Soviet Union and prominent politician, Manai Sophiaan.

Awards and nominations

References

External links

1950 births
Indonesian film actresses
Javanese people
Living people
Place of birth missing (living people)